Cynthia Dall (born Cynthia Meggin Loya) (March 12, 1971 – April 5, 2012), sometimes known as "Cindy Dall", was an American lo-fi musician and photographer. Dall also gained notoriety in the fanzine world of the 1990s for her frequent transgressive-styled cover shots and appearances in Lisa Carver's Rollerderby magazine.

Dall was born in Roseville, California. She started recording and performing with then-boyfriend, Bill Callahan under his former moniker, Smog. She first appeared on the Smog song "Wine Stained Lips", which was a B-side to the 1994 "A Hit" 7" single. Dall went on to contribute vocals and guitar on the Burning Kingdom EP, Wild Love, and The Doctor Came at Dawn, and she toured with Smog in the US and Europe in 1995.

In 1996, Dall released her first solo album, Untitled. The original pressing of the LP had no artist name on the sleeve at the time, but Dall's name was later added for re-pressings. The album features engineering work by Jim O'Rourke, and guitar and vocals by Callahan.

In 1998, she did the vocals for a remix of "Torture Day" by The Notwist.

In 2002, Dall released her second album, Sound Restores Young Men, which was recorded by O'Rourke and Tim Green of The Fucking Champs.

Dall had epilepsy. She also engaged in political activism around Sacramento, helping citizens register to vote.

Dall died in her home in Sacramento on April 5, 2012. According to her record label, she was in the process of working on demos for a new album of material.

Discography
Untitled, Drag City #73 (1996)
Sound Restores Young Men, Drag City #132 (2002)

Footnotes

External links
Cynthia Dall's page at Drag City Records
[ Cynthia Dall Bio on AllMusic.com]
A Fan-Based Profile on MySpace
Goodbye, Cynthia Dall

American indie rock musicians
1971 births
2012 deaths
Musicians from Sacramento, California
American women rock singers
Drag City (record label) artists
Singers from California
People with epilepsy
21st-century American women singers
21st-century American singers